Geita District is located in the Geita Region of Tanzania. According to the 2012 census, the population of the district was 807,619. The district is bordered to the east by Mwanza Region and Nyang'hwale District, to the south by Shinyanga Region and Mbogwe District, and to the west by Chato District.

History
Prior to the creation of the Geita Region in March 2012, the Geita District was part of the Mwanza Region.

Transport

Road
Paved trunk road T4 from Mwanza to Bukoba passes through the district from east to west.

Economy

Mining
Geita Gold Mine is located within Geita District, 4 km west of the town of Geita. The mine is currently being owned and managed by AngloGold Ashanti.

Tourism
Rubondo Island National Park is located on an island in Lake Victoria that is a part of Geita District. It can be reached by ferry from Nkome, a village in the north of the district.

Wards
As of the 2012 census, Geita District council was divided administratively into 35 wards:

 Bugalama
 Bugulula
 Bujula
 Bukoli
 Bukondo
 Bulela
 Bung'wangoko
 Busanda
 Butobela
 Chigunga
 Ihanamilo
 Isulwabutundwe
 Kagu
 Kakubilo
 Kalangalala
 Kamena
 Kamhanga
 Kasamwa
 Kaseme
 Katoma
 Katoro
 Lubanga
 Lwamgasa
 Lwezera
 Mtakuja
 Nkome
 Nyachiluluma
 Nyakagomba
 Nyakamwaga
 Nyamalimbe
 Nyamigota
 Nyanguku
 Nyarugusu
 Nzera
 Senga

References

Districts of Geita Region